Charles Zimmerman may refer to:

 Charles H. Zimmerman (1908–1996), American aeronautical engineer
 Charles S. Zimmerman (1896–1983), American socialist politician and trade union official
 Charles X. Zimmerman (1865–1926), military commander, businessman and politician
 Charles B. Zimmerman (1891–1969), lawyer and judge in Ohio
 Charles A. Zimmermann (1861–1916), American composer